Your Next Life is a 2004 Spanish rural thriller and romantic drama film directed by Manuel Gutiérrez Aragón. It stars Juan Diego, Luis Tosar and Marta Etura alongside Clara Lago, Celso Bugallo and Víctor Clavijo.

Plot 
The plot is set in northern Spain. Over a cow-related row also involving the Severo's kidnapping of Val (Gildo's daughter), Gildo kills Severo. Val and Rai (Severo's son, unbeknownst of the identity of his father's killer) fall romantically for each other.

Cast

Production 
The screenplay was penned by Ángeles González Sinde alongside Manuel Gutiérrez Aragón. The film was produced by Tornasol Films, Continental Producciones and TVG with the participation of TVE, Canal+.

Release 
Distributed by Alta Classics, Your Next Life opened in Spanish theatres on 30 January 2004. It also screened at the 54th Berlin International Film Festival's main competition on 9 February 2004.

Reception 
Jonathan Holland of Variety described the film as "an enjoyably intense rural murder drama-cum-romancer set in the remote Valle de Pas in northern Spain", being "superior anthropology and, for its first hour, superior cinema, too", with "first-class perfs, sore-eyes scenery and solid production values".

The review in Fotogramas highlighted the veracity of the film's characters and its actors, also assessing that whereas "Clara Lago confirms herself as an adult actress when she is still a child, Marta Etura is simply sensational".

Accolades 

|-
| align = "center" rowspan = "11" | 2005 || rowspan = "10" | 3rd Mestre Mateo Awards || colspan = "2" | Best Film ||  || rowspan = "10" | 
|-
| Best Direction || Manuel Gutiérrez Aragón ||  
|-
| rowspan = "2 | Best Actor || Juan Diego || 
|-
| Luis Tosar || 
|-
| Best Actress || Marta Etura ||  
|-
| Best Supporting Actor || Celso Bugallo || 
|-
| Best Screenplay || Ángeles González Sinde, Manuel Gutiérrez Aragón || 
|-
| Best Score || Xavier Capellas || 
|-
| Best Editing || José Salcedo || 
|-
| Best Art Direction || Félix Murcia || 
|-
| 18th European Film Awards || People's Choice Award for Best Actor || Luis Tosar ||  || align = "center" | 
|}

See also 
 List of Spanish films of 2004

References

External links 
 Your Next Life at ICAA's Catálogo de Cinespañol

2004 films
Films set in Spain
Films shot in Cantabria
2004 thriller films
2004 romantic drama films
2000s Spanish-language films
Spanish romantic drama films
Spanish thriller films
Tornasol Films films
2000s Spanish films